Babaganoüj are an Australian indie rock band formed in 2011 in Brisbane by Charles Sale (guitar, vocals), Harriette Pillbeam (bass guitar, vocals), and Peter McDowell (drums). In 2011 after the dissolution of Sale's former band Yves Klein Blue in 2010, Sale released under the band's name an EP for free of old demos he recorded before the band was formed. In 2012, Jack Glesson joined the band as the new drummer, replacing McDowell. Following the release of their debut EP, Sife Lucks (2013), Ruby McGregor joined as the fourth member as the rhythm guitarist. Gleeson left the band in early 2016, and was replaced by Ritchie Daniell (Grates Drummer) on tour during 2016. Later that year, George Browning joined as the band's new official drummer. The band released various standalone singles during 2012–2015 before releasing a trilogy of EPs: Pillar of Light (2016), Hard to Be (2016) and Clarity Restored (2017).

On 12 September 2018, the band announced on their Facebook page that McDowell had died and that he had performed on all the songs from their first Extended Play. The post was a photo from the band's early days that depicts a black and white photo of McDowell holding a synthesiser.

Members
Current band members
 Charles Sale – guitar, vocals 
 Harriette Pillbeam – bass guitar, vocals 
 Ruby McGregor – guitar, vocals 
 George Browning – drums 

Former band members
 Jack Gleeson – drums 
 Peter McDowell – drums 

Former touring members
 Ritchie Daniell – drums

Discography
Releases adapted from the band's Bandcamp and Spotify pages.

Extended plays
 Babaganouj Demo (2011)
 Sife Lucks (2013)
 Pillar of Light (2016)
 Hard to Be (2016)
 Clarity Restored (2017)

Singles
 "It's Raining It's Summer" (2012)
 "Shitty Christmas" (2013)
 "Too Late for Love" / "4U" (2014)
 "Bluff" (2014)
 "Can't Stop" (2015)
 "Hit Song" (2015)
 "Do Rite With Me Tonite" (2016)
 "Star" (2016)
 "Would You Like Me" (2017)

References

2011 establishments in Australia
Australian rock music groups
Musical groups established in 2011
Musical groups from Brisbane